The 2021 Men's Pan-American Volleyball Cup was an exceptional edition of the annual men's volleyball tournament, played by six countries from 3 to 9 September in Santo Domingo, Dominican Republic.

Mexico won the title after defeating Canada in the final by 3–0. Diego González was awarded the Most Valuable Player.

Competing nations

Competition format
The competition format for the 2011 Pan-American Volleyball Cup consists of two phases, the first is a round robin round between all six competing nations. The top four teams advanced to the semifinals.

Pool standing procedure
Match won 3–0: 5 points for the winner, 0 point for the loser;
Match won 3–1: 4 points for the winner, 1 points for the loser;
Match won 3–2: 3 points for the winner, 2 points for the loser;
The first criterion is the number of matches won, second criterion is points gained by the team.
In case of tie, the teams were classified according to the following criteria:
points ratio and sets ratio.

Results
All times are Atlantic Time Zone (UTC−04:00).

Final round

Semifinals

Fifth place match

Third place match

Final

Final standing

Individual awards

Most Valuable Player

Best Scorer

Best Outside Hitters

Best Middle Blockers

Best Setter

Best Opposite

Best Libero

Best Digger

Best Receiver

Best Server

References

Men's Pan-American Volleyball Cup
Men's Pan-American Volleyball Cup
Men's Pan-American Volleyball Cup
2021 Men's Pan-American Volleyball Cup